The NOW Party, often shortened to NOW is a Romanian micro political party centered on green politics and social progressivism.

Leadership

See also 

 European Greens
 Partidul Verde

References 

2021 establishments in Romania
Political parties established in 2021
Centre-left parties in Europe
Green political parties in Romania
Progressive parties
Social democratic parties in Romania